Baba Arab (also Romanized as Bābā ‘Arab; also known as ‘Alavīyeh, Bāb-e ‘Arab, and Bāb-i-Arab) is a village in Alaviyeh Rural District, Kordian District, Jahrom County, Fars Province, Iran. At the 2006 census, its population was 2,238, in 537 families.

References 

Populated places in Jahrom County